Lyprotemyia is a genus of flies in the family Stratiomyidae.

Species
Lyprotemyia flavipes James, 1980
Lyprotemyia formicaeformis Kertész, 1909
Lyprotemyia mimetica James, 1980
Lyprotemyia mutica James, 1980
Lyprotemyia villosa (James, 1939)

References

Stratiomyidae
Brachycera genera
Taxa named by Kálmán Kertész
Diptera of North America
Diptera of South America